Jens Rasmussen (11 May 1926 – 5 February 2018) was a system safety, human factors and cognitive systems engineering researcher at the Risø National Laboratory in Risø, Denmark. He was highly influential within the field of safety science, human error and accident research. His contributions include the skills, rules, knowledge (SRK) framework, risk management framework, dynamic safety model, AcciMap Approach, and others.

Biography 
Rasmussen was born in Ribe, Denmark. In 1950, he earned an M.Sc. degree in electronic engineering, with a background in control engineering. After completing his degree, he worked for several years at the Radio Receiver Research Laboratory.

In 1956, Rasmussen was recruited to work at the Danish Atomic Energy Commission. After several years, he was named the head of the Electronics Department at the Atomic Research Establishment Risø (eventually renamed Risø National Laboratory).

In 1981, Rasmussen was appointed Research Professor at both the Technical University of Denmark and at Risø National Laboratory.

Contributions

Dynamic safety model 
Rasmussen proposed a state-based model of a socio-technical system as a system that moves within a region of a state space. The region is surrounded by three boundaries:

 economic failure
 unacceptable work load
 functionality acceptable performance

Incentives push the system towards the boundary of acceptable performance: accidents happen when the boundary is exceeded.

Risk management framework 
Rasmussen proposed a multi-layer view of socio-technical systems, with hazardous processes and work at the lowest level, and government at the highest level. The different levels involve different research disciplines (e.g., mechanical, chemical, and electrical engineering at the lowest level, political science, la, economics, and sociology at the highest level, and other domains in-between) and different environmental stressors (e.g., changing political climate at the top level, fast pace of technological change at the lowest level)

Skills, rules, knowledge (SRK) framework 
See Skills, Rules, Knowledge (SRK) framework.

Abstraction hierarchy 
See the abstraction hierarchy.

Ecological interface design 
See Ecological interface design.

AcciMaps 
See AcciMap approach.

Selected publications

Books 
 
 
 Jens Rasmussen (2000). Proactive Risk Management in a Dynamic Society. Swedish Rescue Services Agency. ISBN 9172530847.

Papers

References

The Legacy of Jens Rasmussen, special issue of Applied Ergonomics, Volume 59, Part, B, Pages 471-656 (March 2017)

The Legacy of Jens Rasmussen, Adjunct ODAM 2014 Symposium

1926 births
2018 deaths
Danish academics
Safety engineering
People from Ribe
Academic staff of the Technical University of Denmark
Electrical engineers